The Devil May Dance is a novel authored by Jake Tapper. The book takes place during the Kennedy presidency, where the main character, Congressman Charlie Marder and his wife Margaret were assigned by Attorney General Robert F. Kennedy to find out if Frank Sinatra was connected to the Mafia in any way, as he was worried if Kennedy stayed in Sinatra's house in Rancho Mirage, the mafia might try to kill him. In the book they meet famous performers from Los Angeles in The Rat Pack, such as Dean Martin, and Peter Lawford, and members of the Mafia, like Sam Giancana or "Momo".

References

2021 American novels
Political thriller novels
Novels set in the 1960s
Cultural depictions of John F. Kennedy
Cultural depictions of Robert F. Kennedy
Cultural depictions of Frank Sinatra
Rat Pack
Dean Martin
Little, Brown and Company books